Fullerö Castle is a castle and fideicommissum since 1739, in Barkarö, Sweden. Augustin Ehrensvärd, who was in charge of building the Suomenlinna (Sveaborg) fortress, was born in Fullerö Castle. The comital family Cronstedt acquired the castle in the 17th century.

See also
List of castles in Sweden

References 

Castles in Västmanland County
Buildings and structures in Västmanland County

Cronstedt family residences